Haasaa is a Maldivian television series directed by Mohamed Manik and streamed through Baiskoafu. The series stars Fathimath Azifa, Ali Shameel, Ibrahim Jihad, Mariyam Shifa, Sobah, Mujuthaba and Shifana in pivotal roles. The series revolves around a modern young girl (played by Azifa) and the fallout in her life after her live in relationship with an older man (played by Shameel).

Cast

Main
 Fathimath Azifa as Nima
 Ali Shameel as Ramzy
 Ibrahim Jihad as Rifau
 Mariyam Shifa as Mizna
 Sobah as Farish
 Mujuthaba as Mihad
 Aishath Shifana as Ziyadha

Recurring
 Fathimath Latheefa as Maree
 Ali Yooshau as Ammadey
 Mariyam Haleem as Abidha
 Jauza as Shifa
 Junad as Ibrahim
 Mumthaz as Seytu

Guest
 Sheela Najeeb as Shiya (Episode 13)

Episodes

Reception
The first episode of the series met with positive reviews from critics, where Ahmed Rasheed from MuniAvas complimented the acting ability of Fathimath Azifa.

References

Serial drama television series
Maldivian television shows
Maldivian web series